Ayers Falls, is a waterfall located on the outside edge of Santiam State Forest near Mehama, in Marion County, in the U.S. state of Oregon. It is located in an area on the west foothills where Mount Hood National Forest meets with the Middle Santiam Wilderness.

Ayers Falls is created along the course of Ayers Creek, which is the smallest tributary of Stout Creek. Ayers Falls is one of several waterfalls in the region.

See also 
 List of waterfalls in Oregon

References 

Waterfalls of Oregon
Parks in Marion County, Oregon